The Southern Health and Social Care Trust provides health and social care services in Northern Ireland. It runs Craigavon Area Hospital, Daisy Hill Hospital in Newry, Lurgan Hospital and South Tyrone Hospital as well as Armagh Community Hospital and St Luke's Hospital in Armagh. St Luke's provides mental health services.  Daisy Hill Hospital emergency department is under threat because of difficulty in retaining staff. The trust serves an estimated population of 380,312 (June  2017 estimates).

History
The trust was established on 1 April 2007 when the  Health and Social Services Trusts in the five local Government Districts of Newry & Mourne, Banbridge, Armagh, Craigavon and Dungannon were dissolved under the Dissolution Orders 2007.

The Trusts in the Southern Health and Social Services Board Area that were abolished were: 
 Craigavon Area (Lurgan/Portadown) Hospitals Trust
 Craigavon and Banbridge Health and Social Services Trust
 Armagh and Dungannon Health and Social Services Trust 
 Newry & Mourne Health and Social Services Trust

The trust was allocated funds from the Waiting List Initiative in 2015-6 which was supposed to help them meet NHS targets for surgery.  They paid their surgical consultants almost £247,000 to do extra work, but it had no effect on the waiting lists.

References

External links